William Grover "Wild Bill" Hagy (June 17, 1939 – August 20, 2007) was an American baseball fan and cab driver from Dundalk, Maryland, who led famous "O-R-I-O-L-E-S" chants during the late 1970s and early 1980s from section 34 in the upper deck at Memorial Stadium.

Life
Hagy grew up in Sparrows Point, Maryland, and drove an ambulance, an ice cream truck, and eventually a cab until he retired in 2004.

Hagy's chants and persona developed him into an icon associated with the Baltimore Orioles for years.  While leading cheers from "The Roar from 34" at Memorial Stadium, Wild Bill became a Baltimore institution. Standing at six feet two inches tall, Hagy was an easily recognized figure at the ball park, always adorned in sun glasses and a straw cowboy-styled hat. Hagy found the inspiration in his cheers from Leonard "Big Wheel" Burrier, a famous fan who led the Baltimore Colts in similar cheers.

Hagy is said to symbolize the term "Orioles Magic" as his cheers sometimes led to comeback victories for the Orioles.   Eventually the team recognized his enthusiasm and let him do his Orioles cheers from atop the dugout.  Hagy's fame led him to meet Presidents such as Jimmy Carter and Ronald Reagan, and to get writeups in The New York Times.

In 1985, Hagy boycotted Memorial Stadium for not being allowed to bring in his own beer.  At the end of a game he tossed his cooler of beer onto the field, never to return.

Hagy did return to Camden Yards, however, the night Cal Ripken broke the longtime record for consecutive games played.  Hagy led the fans in his famous cheer on one of baseball's greatest nights.

Hagy's last known O-R-I-O-L-E-S cheer was performed at Ripken's Hall of Fame induction ceremony in Cooperstown, New York, on July 29, 2007. Hagy died at his home in Arbutus, Maryland, less than a month after the ceremony.
 
Hagy is in the Orioles Hall of Fame.

Orioles honors
On Tuesday, June 17, 2008 the Baltimore Orioles honored "Wild" Bill Hagy by handing out honorary #34 T-shirts on their "T-shirt Tuesday."

On Saturday, August 9, 2014 the Orioles honored Hagy with a "Wild Bill" hat give away.

See also
Andy the Clown
Robert Szasz
Robin Ficker
Ronnie Woo Woo

References

1939 births
2007 deaths
Baltimore Orioles
People from Baltimore
Baseball spectators
People from Dundalk, Maryland
People from Baltimore County, Maryland
People from Arbutus, Maryland